Sándor Nyiri (sometimes spelled Nyiry)(17 November 1854 – 5 May 1911) was a Hungarian military officer and politician, who served as Minister of Defence of Hungary between 1903 and 1905. From 1899 he was the commander of the Ludoviceum. In 1905 he won a mandate to the House of Representatives as a politician of the Liberal Party. On 19 February 1906 he dissolved the Hungarian Assembly with the police forces quasi the Constitutional Crisis of 1905's closing act.

References
 Magyar Életrajzi Lexikon

1854 births
1911 deaths
People from Szabolcs-Szatmár-Bereg County
Hungarian soldiers
Defence ministers of Hungary
Theresian Military Academy alumni